Corey Franklyn Sawyer (born October 4, 1971) is a former American college and professional football player who was a cornerback in the National Football League (NFL) for six seasons during the 1990s.  He played college football for Florida State University, and earned All-American honors. He played professionally for the Cincinnati Bengals and New York Jets of the NFL, the Memphis Maniax of the XFL, and the Tampa Bay Storm and Chicago Rush of the Arena Football League (AFL).

Early years
Sawyer was born in Key West, Florida.  He graduated from Key West High School, where he played high school football for the Key West Conchs.

College career
Sawyer accepted an athletic scholarship to attend Florida State University, where he played for the Florida State Seminoles football team from 1990 to 1993.  He was recognized as a consensus first-team All-American at defensive back as a senior in 1993, and was a member of the Seminoles' team that defeated the Nebraska Cornhuskers 18–16 in the Orange Bowl to win the Bowl Coalition national championship.

Professional career
He played in 60 regular season games for the Bengals, mostly as a backup at cornerback, but also as a punt and kickoff returner. In his five seasons in Cincinnati, he returned 54 punts for 507 yards and a touchdown, and 15 kickoffs for 305 yards. As a defensive back, he compiled 163 tackles and 11 interceptions for 163 return yards and a touchdown.

He played for the Memphis Maniax of the XFL in 2001. He then played for the Tampa Bay Storm and Chicago Rush of the Arena Football League (AFL) from 2002 to 2004.

References

1971 births
Living people
All-American college football players
American football cornerbacks
Cincinnati Bengals players
Florida State Seminoles football players
New York Jets players
Tampa Bay Storm players
Chicago Rush players
People from Key West, Florida
Memphis Maniax players